One World is a televised series of in-depth interviews hosted by Deepak Chopra, and directed and executively produced by Martine Dubin. It is an original series produced by the Martine Dubin Company for NEWSWIRE.FM, featuring newsmakers across the professional spectrum.

Distribution
One World episodes are available on-demand, and by linear digital broadcasting on the digital broadcasting on the digital broadcast network NEWSWIREFM, becoming popular worldwide.

The show has also been available via SONIFI Solutions in 1.4 million hotel rooms across North America.

In Toronto, Canada, the series was also available for TTC riders in the TTC subway system through BAI Canada and TConnect Wifi.

As of March 2015, One World is also available on John Hendricks’ global ad-free subscription video on-demand service CuriosityStream.

One World was also broadcast on the SiriusXM Satellite Radio Oprah Radio channel in the US and Canada, Sirius 204/XM107, Mondays at 7 pm ET, prior to the channel going off the air in January 2015.

History
One World premiered on October 16, 2013. As part of the launch of the One World series, host Deepak Chopra and executive producer and director Martine Dubin, along with Ray Chambers, Frederique van der Wal, Paulette Cole, Paul Scialla, and the One World production crew  rang the Opening Bell at the NASDAQ MarketSite in Times Square.

Music 
One World's music is composed and produced by Dennis White, aka Static Revenger.

Guests 
Past guests include:
Cameron Alborzian	
Shiva Ayyadurai
Dr. Anirban Bandyopadhyay
Cori Bargmann
Nigel Barker
Ala'a Basatneh
Stacey Bendet
H.A. Berlin
Charles Best
Dr. Mohammad Bhuiyan
Neil Blumenthal
Chris Burch
Charisma Carpenter
Ray Chambers
Desmond Child
Mallika Chopra
Sanjiv Chopra
Kenneth Cole
Celine Cousteau
Fabien Cousteau
Willem Dafoe
William Davis (cardiologist)
Sharad Devarajan
DJ Spooky
Fran Drescher
Esther Dyson
Mick Ebeling
Diane Von Furstenberg 
Johan Ernst Nilson
David Gorodyansky
Vani Hari
Annette Herfkens
Sylvia Ann Hewlett
Arianna Huffington
Mark Hyman (doctor)
JeromeASF 
Jazz Johnson
Wayne Jonas
Michio Kaku
Donna Karan
Ben Kaufman
Georg Kell
Dr. Raphael Kellman
Dacher Keltner
Calvin Klein
John Kluge Jr.
Ken Kobayashi
Krishna Das
Nicholas Kristof
Jaron Lanier
Lauren Bush Lauren
Michael Lazerow
Sugar Ray Leonard (Olympics) 
Eric Lichtblau
Martin Lindstrom
Lucy Liu 
Lisa Lovatt-Smith
Tara Mandal
Mike D
Lisa Miller
Keith Mitchell
Leonard Mlodinow
Luc Montagnier
Trevor Moran
Shree K. Nayar
Hafez Nazeri
Marc Ostrofsky
Alan Patricof
Benjamin Patton
Bruce Poon Tip
Courtney Reum
Michael Roizen
David Rose
Linda Rottenberg
Rachel Roy
Tim Ryan (politician)
Kabir Sehgal
Dov Seidman
Jason Silva
Russell Simmons
Martha Stewart
Tara Stiles
Rudolph E. Tanzi
Max Tegmark
Peter Thum
Robert Thurman
Paul Tudor Jones
Frederique van der Wal
Stephanie Watson
Sheryl Wudunn
Randi Zuckerberg

References

2013 American television series debuts
2010s American television talk shows